Edythe Perlick [Edie] (December 12, 1922 – February 27, 2003) was a left fielder who played from  through  in the All-American Girls Professional Baseball League.

Overview profile
Perlick has been listed as one of the Top 20 AAGPBL Players of All Time, according to baseball researcher Sharon L. Roepke. A three-time All-Star, Perlick is often described as a multifaceted five-tool player. She was able to hit for average and power, was a smart and speedy baserunner, and combined fielding abilities with a strong and accurate throwing arm.

Early life
A native of Chicago, Illinois, Perlick grew up in a German family in northwestern Chicago. Her father worked as an accountant. She had one sister, Jean, and a brother, Allan. At age 12, Perlick played volleyball and fast-pitch softball in the Chicago city leagues. She later competed in softball tournaments after graduating from high school and attended teachers college for one year.

Birth of the AAGPBL
In February 1943, Philip K. Wrigley founded the All-American Girls League. Wrigley, a chewing gum manufacturer and owner of the Chicago Cubs Major League Baseball club, materialized his idea as a promotional sideline to maintain interest in baseball as the World War II military draft was depleting major-league rosters of first-line players. Ann Harnett became the first girl signed by the league for its inaugural season, being followed by Claire Schillace, Perlick and Shirley Jameson.

AAGPBL career
Perlick enjoyed many firsts in her illustrious baseball career. She was one of the original 60 players in the league, and her team, the Racine Belles, won the first AAGPBL Championship Title in 1943, defeating the Kenosha Comets three games to none. She also became the first left fielder to be included in the All-Star Team, a distinction that she repeated in 1947 and 1948.

In an eight-season career, Perlick was a .240 hitter in a pitching-dominated league. In her rookie season, she batted a career-best .268, which was the league's 12th highest average among regular players. She collected 481 stolen bases in her career, but perhaps her best quality was her timely hitting in clutch situations. Usually, she led the Belles in runs batted in, driving in a career-high 63 runs in 1944 to set a Racine season-record, leading again led the Belles in 1945 (41), 1948 (51), 1949 (41) and 1950 (59). She averaged 49 RBI in each of her eight seasons, and her 392 career RBI ranks her sixth in the All-Time list.

In 1946, Perlick hit .230 with a career-high 88 stolen bases and belted four home runs as cleanup hitter, helping the Belles to clinch their second Championship Title.

But at the end of 1950 the Belles lacked the financial resources to keep the club playing in Racine, Wisconsin. Before the 1951 season, when the team moved to Battle Creek, Michigan, Perlick, along with original Belles Eleanor Dapkus, Maddy English, Sophie Kurys and Joanne Winter, were disappointment and decided not to make the move. During eight years, the Belles were a close-knit team, always like a family away from home. Perlick and teammates thought that all would be different, like a new team, maybe a new manager and, specially, a new location. Perlick returned to Chicago and played fast-pitch softball for two years with the Admiral Music Maids of the National Girls Baseball League.

Milestone
In 1980, former AAGPBL player June Peppas motivated a group of friends and began assembling a list of names and addresses of her former pals. Her initiative turned into a newsletter and resulted in the league's first-ever reunion in Chicago, Illinois in 1982. Stemming from that reunion, a Players Association was formed in 1987 and many former AAGPBL players continued to enjoy reunions, which became annual events in 1998. In November 1988, Perlick, along with her former teammates and opponents, received their long overdue recognition, when the Baseball Hall of Fame and Museum in Cooperstown, New York dedicated a permanent display to the All American Girls Professional Baseball league. The association was largely responsible for the opening of the exhibition.

Private life
After being married in 1952, she also played under the name Edie Keating or Edie Perlick Keating. At age 30, she left the game, raised her daughter, Susan, and worked in Chicago for manufacturing firms A.B. Dick Company and Teletype Corporation. She had two grandsons, Danny and Jeff. After moving to Fort Lauderdale, Florida, she worked another 25 years for Harris Corporation, a computer systems company. She retired in 1993 and moved to Pompano Beach, Florida, where she died at the age of 80.

References

All-American Girls Professional Baseball League players
Baseball players from Chicago
1922 births
2003 deaths
National Girls Baseball League players
20th-century American women
20th-century American people
21st-century American women
American female baseball players